The 2011 Rostelecom Cup was the final event of six in the 2011–12 ISU Grand Prix of Figure Skating, a senior-level international invitational competition series. It was held at the Ice Palace Megasport in Moscow on November 24–27. Medals were awarded in the disciplines of men's singles, ladies' singles, pair skating, and ice dancing. Skaters earned points toward qualifying for the 2011–12 Grand Prix Final.

Eligibility
Skaters who reached the age of 14 by July 1, 2011 were eligible to compete on the senior Grand Prix circuit.

In July 2011, minimum score requirements were added to the Grand Prix series and were set at two-thirds of the top scores at the 2011 World Championships. Prior to competing in a Grand Prix event, skaters were required to earn the following:

Entries
The entries were as follows.

Schedule
(Local time, UTC +04:00):

 Thursday, November 24
 10:30–15:15 – Official practices
 Friday, November 25
 08:00–13:25 – Official practices
 15:00–16:20 – Ladies' short
 16:45–17:45 – Pairs' short
 18:00–18:30 – Opening ceremony
 18:45–20:05 – Men's short
 20:25–21:45 – Short dance
 Saturday, November 26
 08:00–13:25 – Official practices
 14:00–15:30 – Ladies' free
 15:55–17:10 – Pairs' free
 17:30–19:10 – Men's free
 19:30–21:05 – Free dance
 Sunday, November 27
 08:00–10:35 – Official practices
 14:00–14:20 – Medal ceremonies
 14:35–17:00 – Exhibitions

Results

Men

Ladies

Pairs

Ice dancing

References

External links

 
 ISU website: Entries

Rostelecom Cup, 2011
Rostelecom Cup
2011 in Russian sport